The House of Bodleigh is a heritage-listed former hall and now offices located at 24-26 Kent Street, in the inner city Sydney suburb of Millers Point in the City of Sydney local government area of New South Wales, Australia. It is called Rawson Hall. There House off Bodleigh does not appear on the foundation stone of the front of the building.  The property was added to the New South Wales State Heritage Register on 2 April 1999.

History 
Millers Point is one of the earliest areas of European settlement in Australia, and a focus for maritime activities. Building constructed  on vacant land between rows of 1860s terrace housing.

Description 
Two-storey face brick Federation building used as offices. Arched entry to doorway, fanlights over lower door and windows. Roof concealing pediment. Storeys: Two; Construction: Brick and stone walls, corrugated galvanised iron roof. Style: Federation.

The external condition of the property is good.

Modifications and dates 
External: Painted brick on top storey. Fenestration changed. Last inspected: 21 February 1995. Internal: Possible important interiors concealed by later infill. Interesting interior joinery.

Heritage listing 
As at 23 November 2000, this is an interesting two storey brick building, former hall now used as offices, strong brick and stone character presenting solidly to the street.

It is part of the Millers Point Conservation Area, an intact residential and maritime precinct. It contains residential buildings and civic spaces dating from the 1830s and is an important example of C19th adaptation of the landscape.

House of Bodleigh was listed on the New South Wales State Heritage Register on 2 April 1999.

See also 

Australian residential architectural styles

References

Attribution

External links

 

New South Wales State Heritage Register sites located in Millers Point
Houses in Millers Point, New South Wales
Office buildings in New South Wales
Federation style architecture
Community buildings in New South Wales
Articles incorporating text from the New South Wales State Heritage Register
Millers Point Conservation Area